Joseph Mechlin Jr. (died 1839) was a physician and colonial agent of the American Colonization Society in Liberia two times.

References

Agents and Governors of Liberia
19th-century Liberian physicians
1839 deaths
Year of birth missing